The list of ship commissionings in 1870 includes a chronological list of all ships commissioned in 1870.



References

1870
 Ship commissionings